The Gateway Tower is a 31-storey mixed use skyscraper located in the Araneta City at Quezon City. The tower was named after the adjacent Gateway Mall and serves as the headquarters of the Araneta Group, replacing the Aurora Tower since 2014. Moreover, the tower sits on a rectangular lot located along General Aguinaldo Avenue and features retail and electronics stores, dining outlets, hair salons, office spaces, an open air rooftop garden, and an art gallery, while the tower's upper floors are also occupied by various call centers, franchising, and tech companies.

Initially planned as a 25-storey tower, groundbreaking for the tower took place in 2005, while the tower's construction phase began in 2010, and after a series of architectural design changes and upgrades to cater the rising demand of office spaces in the area, the tower was completed in 2014.

History and Construction
The Gateway Tower project plans have been in place since the opening of the Gateway Mall 1 in 2004, as part of the Araneta Center Master Plan. The plans for the tower  consists of an expanded retail podium with direct connections to the Gateway Mall, offices for Business Process Outsourcing/Information Technology (BPO-IT) companies, and penthouse offices. The site of the tower was set within the Gateway Mall's eastern side, wherein the old Plaza Fair once stood, and formerly served as one of the biggest department store chains in the area. The tower's groundbreaking works began in 2005, but construction was delayed in 2006 over construction issues hounding the Gateway Mall, which ended in a lawsuit with the Gateway Mall's contractor, CE Construction Corporation, and the Araneta Group was forced to pay ₱114 million on the case. Initially, the construction of the Gateway Tower commenced on second half of 2010, with Design Coordinates, Inc. (DCI) Construction as the main contractor of the project, using structural steel frames for the structure of the tower, which is similarly used to the construction of the One World Trade Center in New York City and the Rufino Pacific Tower in Makati City, making the Gateway Tower as one of the tallest steel-framed towers in the country.

The tower was topped off at the first half of 2012, while the tower's tenants began occupying the building's retail areas in December 2012. To cater the new expansion of the Gateway Mall, some areas of the mall we're yielded to the Gateway Tower Mall through additional walkways and access points, which also increased a number of retail shops within the mall, while the Rustan's Department Store was widened and occupies 4 floors with additional spaces of the current complex. The Gateway Tower Mall's soft opening was made in June 2013, with the first five floors opening its doors to various shops, food stalls and services, while the full opening of the new Gateway Mall expansion was completed on the 4th quarter of 2013. On the 2nd quarter of 2014, the tower was fully completed, with tower's upper office tenants began occupying the mall. The department stores caters over 800 various brands and also features a VIP Lounge, a breastfeeding station, and a cafe, in partnership with East Cafe.

Location
The tower is strategically located at the northern area of the Araneta City, located near the Aurora Tower within the northeast, and stands along Gen. Aguinaldo Avenue. The tower is also situated within Gen. Malvar and Gen. Roxas Avenues, and is connected to the Gateway Mall, the Gateway Office Building occupied by Accenture, and the Araneta Center-Cubao LRT Station in the north; the New Frontier Theater and the Manhattan Parkview of the Manhattan Gardens condominium complex via elevated bridge on the east, which were completed on the 4th Quarter of 2018, and on the 2nd Quarter of 2019, respectively. The tower is also located near the Farmers Market, the Farmers Plaza, and the MRT Araneta Center-Cubao Station in the west; while standing in the tower's southern areas are the Araneta City Cyberpark, the Araneta City Bus Port, and major shopping centers such as, Shopwise, Ali Mall and SM Cubao via elevated walkways.

The tower is also part of the Gateway Square, a block consisting the two Gateway Malls, the Gateway Office Building, the Novotel Manila Araneta City, the Ibis Styles Araneta City, the Smart Araneta Coliseum, and the Araneta Coliseum Parking Garage, all connected by bridges and walkways.

Architecture
The tower's designs were inspired from the adjacent Gateway Mall, and was designed by the AC Redevelopment Design Group, in association of local architectural firm Palafox Associates by Filipino architect Felino Palafox and American architectural firm RTKL Associates. The Araneta Group also hired ALT Limited as the project's facade consultant, which also served as the facade consultant for the both the 8 Rockwell at Rockwell Center, the LKG Tower, the Philamlife Tower, and the G.T. International Tower in Makati, the TV5 Media Center in Mandaluyong, and the Metrobank Center in Bonifacio Global City, as well as in various skyscrapers worldwide, such as the Burj Khalifa in Dubai, the One Shenzhen Bay Landmark Tower 7 in One Shenzhen Bay, in Shenzhen, the International Commerce Centre in Hong Kong, the Guangzhou CTF Finance Centre, and the Taipei 101. The tower's contemporary facade shows a mixture of green-colored glass windows with a mix of concrete, and features an set of external glass walls with aesthetic upward curvatures within the tower's northern and southern portions.

Tenants and Features
The tower is directly connected to the Gateway Mall with additional  of retail spaces, known as the Gateway Tower Mall area, and houses local and foreign companies within the tower's upper area; such as the Araneta Group, which occupies the tower's two topmost floors; Accenture, which serves as the tower's second main tenant, Regus, AIG, TTEC, Horizon Recruitment Pacific Corporation, and Keller Williams Realty. The Gateway Tower is PEZA certified, making the tower business-friendly due to various fiscal incentives offered to businesses.

The tower features a sculpture crafted by Filipino National Artist Benedicto Cabrera (BenCab), known as the Monumental Triptych, located at the tower's main lobby. The tower also houses the Gateway Gallery, an Art museum that showcases history, arts and culture, which exhibits the Siningsaysay: Philippine History in Art, in a partnership with the University of the Philippines Diliman and the UP Alumni Association. The tower also features the Topiary Garden, an open-air area rooftop garden; a 2-storey penthouse, located at the building's two topmost floors, and a helipad on the tower's roofdeck.

Gallery

References

Buildings and structures in Quezon City